USS St. Sebastian (SP-470) was a United States Navy patrol vessel in commission from 1917 to 1919.

St. Sebastian was built as a private motorboat of the same name by Captain R. D. Hardee at St. Sebastian, Florida. On 25 June 1917, the U.S. Navy acquired her from her owner, J. W. Taylor of Marathon, Florida, for use as a section patrol vessel during World War I. She was commissioned as USS St. Sebastian (SP-470) on 9 August 1917.

St. Sebastian operated on patrol duty in Florida waters for the rest of World War I and into early 1919. She was out of commission and awaiting sale when she became one of several section patrol boats destroyed at Key West, Florida, on 9 September 1919 by the Florida Keys Hurricane.

Sources vary as to when St. Sebastian was stricken from the Navy List. It may have occurred on 24 April 1919 in advance of her being put up for sale or on 4 October 1919 after her destruction.

Notes

References

Department of the Navy Naval History and Heritage Command Online Library of Selected Images: U.S. Navy Ships: USS Saint Sebastian (SP-470), 1917–1919. Originally the civilian motor boat St. Sebastian.
NavSource Online: Section Patrol Craft Photo Archive: St. Sebastian (SP 470)

Patrol vessels of the United States Navy
World War I patrol vessels of the United States
Ships built in Florida
Maritime incidents in 1919
Shipwrecks of the Florida Keys